Charuka Kahagalla (born 9 June 1988) is a Sri Lankan cricketer. He is a left-handed batsman and right-arm off-break bowler who plays for Sebastianites Cricket and Athletic Club. He was born in Diwulapitaya.

Kahagalla made his List A debut during the 2009-10 Premier Limited Overs Tournament, against Burgher Recreation Club. He did not bat or bowl in the match, making his debut with the bat in the following match, scoring 11 runs against Police Sports Club.

External links
Charuka Kahagalla at Cricket Archive 

1988 births
Living people
Sri Lankan cricketers
Sebastianites Cricket and Athletic Club cricketers
Place of birth missing (living people)